Simone Zanon (born 30 May 1975) is a former Italian male long-distance runner who competed at five editions of the IAAF World Cross Country Championships at senior level (1996, 1997, 2000, 2002, 2005). He won two national championships at senior level (5000 m: 1997, 2005).

Achievements

References

External links
 

1975 births
Living people
Italian male long-distance runners
Universiade medalists in athletics (track and field)
Athletics competitors of Fiamme Oro
Universiade gold medalists for Italy
Medalists at the 1997 Summer Universiade